The Navajo phrase Béésh bąąh dah siʼání may refer to:

 Navajo Nation Council, the legislative of the Navajo Nation
 Navajo Nation Council Chamber, historical landmark and legislative building in Window Rock, Arizona